The Grand Hyatt Hong Kong is a luxury Hyatt hotel in Hong Kong, and the Asian flagship of Hyatt International. It has been described in a New York Times travel article as a "world-famous prestige" property. It opened on 21 November 1989 and is located at 1 Harbour Road, Wan Chai, adjacent to the Hong Kong Convention and Exhibition Centre.

The hotel has 11 food and beverage outlets, famous in both their good quality of food and service.

VIP visits
The Grand Hyatt Hong Kong has been attended by heads of state and heads of government including Bill Clinton in 1998 and Chinese president Hu Jintao, premier Zhu Rongji, vice-premier Li Keqiang in their first visit to Hong Kong.

Plateau Spa
In 2004, the 11th floor was converted into a spa and "hotel with a hotel" named "The Plateau" at a cost of some US$10 million. Plateau Spa was awarded as "Top 15 World's Best Spas" by a Travel + Leisure readers' poll in 2007. Encouraged by the results of the experiment, Hyatt now plans to install spas in all its Park Hyatt and some other Grand Hyatt brand hotels.

References

External links

Hotels in Hong Kong
Hyatt Hotels and Resorts
1989 establishments in Hong Kong
Hotels established in 1989
Hotel buildings completed in 1989